Anchor and Hope is a 2017 Spanish-British romantic comedy-drama film directed by Carlos Marques-Marcet. The screenplay, written by Marques-Marcet and Jules Nurrish, was inspired by Maternidades subversivas by María Llopis (Spain, 2015). It stars Oona Chaplin, Natalia Tena, David Verdaguer, and Geraldine Chaplin. The film had its world premiere at the BFI London Film Festival on 10 October 2017.

Plot

Eva and Kat's humble, yet carefree, life in their London canal boat is turned upside down when Eva gives Kat an ultimatum: she wants a child. Kat resists, knowing that it will end the bohemian lifestyle she's always envisaged with Eva. When Kat's best friend from Barcelona, Roger, stops by to party with them, the three toy around with the idea of creating a baby together. Feeling backed into a corner, Kat consents. Surprisingly, the unusual do-it-yourself donor insemination is successful. As Eva enjoys her pregnancy and Roger fantasizes about his role in the new family, Kat begins to feel like a third wheel and starts to distance herself. When Eva has an unexpected miscarriage, everyone's true feelings are laid bare, leading Eva and Kat to break up while Roger prepares to go back to Barcelona. The three soon realize, however, that they can't survive without each other, and a new journey begins to build a family.

Cast
 Oona Chaplin as Eva
 Natalia Tena as Kat
 David Verdaguer as Roger
 Geraldine Chaplin as Germaine
 Becky Bullman as Vicky
 Lara Rossi as Jinx

Development and production
The screenplay was influenced by the 2015 political book Maternidades subversivas by María Llopis. Principal photography began in London on 5 September 2016.

Anchor and Hope was produced by Lastor Media, Vennerfilm, and La Panda Productions, with financing also provided by the Department of Culture of the Generalitat de Catalunya and the MEDIA Programme of Creative Europe.

Avalon Distribución acquired the distribution rights in Spain for Tierra firme (Anchor and Hope) in August 2017. International rights for Anchor and Hope was acquired by Visit Films in October 2017. In May 2018, Network acquired the distribution rights to the United Kingdom from Visit Films, with rights to the United States picked up by Wolfe Releasing.

Release
Anchor and Hope held its world premiere on 10 October 2017 at the BFI London Film Festival. It premiered theatrically in Spain on 24 November 2017, and in the United Kingdom on 28 September 2018.

Home media
Anchor and Hope became available as video on demand in the United States on 20 November 2018. The DVD was released by Wolfe Video in Region 1 on 27 November 2018. In the U.S., the film became available for streaming on Netflix on 15 February 2019.

Reception

Critical response
On review aggregator Rotten Tomatoes, Anchor and Hope has a 76% rating based on 29 reviews, and an average rating of 6.6/10. On Metacritic, the film has a score of 67 (out of 100) based on 9 reviews from mainstream critics, indicating "generally favorable reviews".

It was named one of the "best queer films of 2018" by IndieWire. Female-centered film productions reviewer Womentainment said Eva and Kat's story was presented "in the most honest, heartfelt and beautiful way."

Accolades 

|-
| rowspan = "13" align = "center" | 2018 || 5th Feroz Awards || colspan = "2" | Best Comedy Film ||  || 
|-
| rowspan = "11" | 10th Gaudí Awards || colspan = "2" | Best Film Not in the Catalan Language ||  || rowspan = "11" | 
|-
| Best Director || Carlos Marques-Marcet || 
|-
| Best Screenplay || Carlos Marques-Marcet, Jules Nurrish || 
|-
| Best Actress || Oona Chaplin || 
|-
| Best Actor || David Verdaguer || 
|-
| Best Production Supervision || Sergi Moreno, Sophie Venner || 
|-
| Best Art Direction || Tim Dickel || 
|-
| Best Supporting Actress || Natalia Tena || 
|-
| Best Cinematography || Dagmar Weaver-Madsen || 
|-
| Best Costume Design || Vinyet Escobar || 
|-
| Best Sound || Diego Casares, Jonathan Darch, Dani Zacharias || 
|-
| 27th Actors and Actresses Union Awards || Best Film Actress in a Minor Role || Geraldine Chaplin ||  || 
|}

References

External links
 
 Tierra firme (Anchor and Hope) at Avalon Distribución
 Anchor and Hope  at Visit Films
 Anchor and Hope  Press Kit
 Anchor and Hope at La Panda Productions
 Anchor and Hope at British Board of Film Classification
 
 Anchor and Hope at Lumiere

2017 films
2017 LGBT-related films
2017 romantic comedy-drama films
British independent films
British LGBT-related films
British romantic comedy-drama films
Spanish independent films
Spanish LGBT-related films
Spanish romantic comedy-drama films
Lesbian-related films
LGBT-related romantic comedy-drama films
2017 comedy films
2017 drama films
2017 independent films
Films directed by Carlos Marques-Marcet
2010s British films